Tommi Liikka, professionally known as Eevil Stöö, is a Finnish rapper. In addition to his solo work, he is also one half of the rap duo Siniset Punaiset Miehet.

Career

Eevil Stöö's first album Pinkkibikinihinkkichiksi was released in 2002, but it was his 2011 album Stöö of Destruction that first brought him commercial success. Produced entirely by DJ Kridlokk, the album peaked at number 24 on the Official Finnish Album Chart.

On 20 July 2012 Eevil Stöö and a fellow rapper Koksukoo released an album Fuck Vivaldi. In the first week of its release, the album debuted at number one on the Official Finnish Album Chart. It was later nominated for an Emma Award in the category of the best Hip Hop / Reggae / Urban Album of 2012.

Selected discography

Albums
Pinkkibikinihinkkichiksi (2002)
Proud to Be a Stöö (2006)
Stöö of Destruction (2011)
Fuck Vivaldi (2012) with Koksukoo
MNTTT (2014) aka Menetetyt with Aztra
Iso Vauva Jeesus (2016) with Nuori Derrick
Saattaa olla ninja (2019) with KoksuKoo
2020 (2019) with Aztra
6lack Album (2020) with Pehmee Goo
Marsipan Wave (2021)

Mixtapes
Pure Ana & Happyhappy Joyjoy Memphis Underground Mix Pt.1 (2006)
StöKISS (2013)

EPs
Eevil Stöön joulumanteli + rusinat (2005)
Joulustöö (2006)
Pomo Sapiens (2017) with Kube
Internetil ei oo tunteit (2019)
B.M.T (2019) with OPA & Pehmee Goo

References

Living people
Finnish rappers
Masked musicians
Alternative hip hop musicians
Year of birth missing (living people)